WOGR-FM (93.3 MHz) is an FM radio station in Salisbury, North Carolina.  The station has an urban gospel radio format with some Christian talk and teaching programs.  It is owned by Victory Christian Center, Inc. 
Programming is simulcast on WOGR (1540 AM) Charlotte, WGAS (1420 AM) in South Gastonia and FM translator W202BW (88.3 MHz) in Harrisburg.

History
The station was originally launched in 1977 as WNDN-FM, the college radio station of Catawba College in Salisbury. It was subsequently acquired by Victory Christian Center in 1996 to expand the broadcast area of 1540 WOGR in Charlotte.

References

External links

OGR-FM
Gospel radio stations in the United States
Radio stations established in 1977
1977 establishments in North Carolina
OGR-FM
Salisbury, North Carolina